The 2005 FEI European Dressage Championships, was the 24th edition of the European Dressage Championship. It was held at Hof Kasselmann in Hagen, Germany, from 28 July to 31 July 2005. The 2005 European Dressage Championships was previously allocated to Moscow, Russia but due financial problems of the organizer they were not able to organise the Championships and had to withdraw two weeks before the start. Ulrich Kasselmann jumped in as last minute organizer of the European Championships and organised the show at the same date as Moscow was supposed to organise.

Events

Dressage

Individual freestyle

Individual special

Team

Medal summary

Medal table

Medalists

References

European Dressage Championships
Equestrian sports competitions in Germany